The Speaker of the Legislative Assembly of Ontario is the presiding officer of the Legislative Assembly of Ontario.

Notable elections

1920 
Nelson Parliament was a Liberal representing Prince Edward riding, who was named Speaker when the United Farmers of Ontario and Labour Party formed a coalition government in the 15th Legislative Assembly of Ontario. A considerable number of members in the governing party were either freshly elected or chosen to serve as government ministers (which made them ineligible to be elected). As a result, the Premier, E.C. Drury, looked to the opposition benches for a Speaker, and chose Parliament, who had served as an MPP since 1914. Upon becoming Speaker, Parliament resigned from the Liberal caucus and sat without party affiliation, as a compromise for his election. While this is the normal practice in the British House of Commons, it is the only time it has happened in Ontario.

1977 
Jack Stokes was the NDP MPP for Lake Nipigon, and was named Speaker by Progressive Conservative Premier Bill Davis. His election is an example of an instance where a member of an opposing party was elected to the position. Davis was elected to lead a minority government and having an opposition MPP as Speaker was a means of denying the opposition one vote (as the Speaker only votes in the occasion of a tie and then must vote by precedent).

1985 
Liberal Party MPP Hugh Edighoffer (Perth) was named Speaker following the 1985 provincial election that returned a slim minority Progressive Conservative government under Frank Miller. The opposition Liberals and NDP together controlled a majority of seats and so Miller nominated Edighoffer as Speaker, with Liberal leader David Peterson seconding the nomination, and Edighoffer was acclaimed. Days later, the Miller government was brought down by a Motion of Non-Confidence and, as a result of an accord between the Liberals and the NDP, Liberal leader David Peterson was asked to form a government without the legislature being dissolved and a new election. Edighoffer, a Liberal MPP, remained Speaker for the duration of the Peterson government as well.

1990 
NDP MPP David William Warner (Scarborough-Ellesmere) was elected Speaker on the second ballot, in the first election held for the position by secret ballot, as the result of a reform introduced by the newly-elected Ontario New Democratic Party government of Bob Rae. Warner won over Liberals Jean Poirier (Prescott and Russell) and Gilles Morin (Carleton East) and PC MPP Norm Sterling (Carleton).

1996
On the seventh ballot, PC MPP Chris Stockwell (Etobicoke West) was elected Speaker, defeating fellow PC MPP Margaret Marland (Mississauga South), who was the preferred choice of Premier Mike Harris. Candidates eliminated in the previous six ballots were PC MPPs David Tilson (Dufferin-Peel) Jack Carroll (Chatham-Kent), Gary Leadston (Kitchener-Wilmot), and Derwyn Shea (High Park—Swansea), NDP MPP Floyd Laughren (Nickel Belt) and Liberal Gilles Morin (Carleton East).

2011
There were nine candidates for the position of Speaker in the 40th Ontario legislature, held after the 2011 provincial election returned a minority Liberal government. The Liberal candidates were Donna Cansfield, who was supported by Premier Dalton McGuinty, Kevin Flynn, Dave Levac and David Zimmer. A fifth candidate, Progressive Conservative MPP Frank Klees withdrew after his bid failed to receive sufficient support from either side of the aisle.

David Zimmer dropped off after the first ballot. On the second ballot, Dave Levac was elected Speaker. The actual vote totals were not released.

2014
Liberal MPP Dave Levac was re-elected to a second term as Speaker at the first session of the 41st Parliament held on July 2, 2014, becoming the first Speaker since Hugh Edighoffer to serve more than one term. Levac defeated NDP MPP Paul Miller and Progressive Conservative Rick Nicholls on the third ballot. NDP MPP Cheri DiNovo was eliminated on the first ballot and Liberal MPP Shafiq Qaadri was eliminated on the second ballot. Actual vote totals were not released.

2018
PC MPP Ted Arnott was elected as Speaker at the first session of the 42nd Parliament held on July 11, 2018 on the first ballot, defeating Randy Hillier, Jane McKenna and Rick Nicholls. Arnott was one of the three longest serving members of the legislature at the time of election.

2022
Arnott was re-elected Speaker on August 8, 2022, defeating a challenge by fellow PC MPP Nina Tangri, who had been endorsed by Premier Doug Ford.

Election 

As with other Speakers that are modeled on the Westminster system, the Speaker of the Legislative Assembly is elected using a secret ballot. Since 1990, the position has been elected by MPPs in this manner. Previously, the Speaker had been appointed directly by the Premier of Ontario after consultation with the Leader of the Opposition and the leader of the third-largest party, and then ratified by the legislature. David Warner was the first Speaker to be elected by his or her peers. This change reflects a similar reform undertaken by the federal House of Commons in 1986.

The Speaker is usually a member of the governing party. The only exceptions have been Jack Stokes, Nelson Parliament and Hugh Edighoffer.

The Speaker is required to perform his or her office impartially, but does not resign from his or her party membership upon taking office. This is identical to the system in place in the federal House of Commons, but stands in contrast to the Speaker of the House of Commons of the United Kingdom. The only Speaker of the Legislative Assembly to have resigned his party affiliation upon election was Nelson Parliament, who was elected in 1920.

List of speakers of the Legislative Assembly
Key:

List of current presiding officers
The Speaker of the Legislative Assembly is assisted by four other MPPs who are, along with the Speaker, collectively known as the presiding officers. Standing Order 2 of the Legislative Assembly requires that up to three of the five presiding officers hail from the Official Opposition. In the 43rd Parliament, however, the tradition of appointing three Official Opposition presiding officers was broken when three members from the governing Progressive Conservatives were appointed: Ted Arnott by secret ballot, and Donna Skelly and Patrice Barnes by the Government House Leader Paul Calandra, despite the fact that the Official Opposition NDP had put forward Jill Andrew and Jennifer French—in addition to eventual presiding officer Bhutila Karpoche—as appointees. Calandra dismissed Andrew's and French's appointments and selected Karpoche, Barnes and Lucille Collard from the Liberals, despite the Liberals not holding official party status in the Legislature. Skelly's appointment to the Deputy Speaker position was also unusual in that the role was traditionally given to the runner-up of the Speaker's election, which Skelly did not contend in (the true runner-up was Nina Tangri, who was Arnott's only challenger).

The Deputy Speaker is first in line to take the Chair in the absence of the Speaker. The Deputy Speaker is also ex officio the Chair of the Committee of the Whole House. The next three presiding officers are entitled deputy chairs of the Committee of the Whole House.

As with the Speaker, the other presiding officers are required to remain impartial in the Chair, but are not required to resign from their political party. They may participate in debate and vote as with any other member, when not in the Chair.

Residence
The Speaker once had both reception space and an apartment within the Ontario Legislative Building. After the closure of Chorley Park in 1937, the reception space was transferred over to the Lieutenant Governor of Ontario, as a non-residential vice regal suite. The Speaker maintains a residence at the Legislature, known as the Speaker's Apartment.

See also
 Speakers of the Legislative Assembly of Upper Canada

References

External links
The Speaker of the Legislative Assembly from the Ontario Legislative Assembly website. Biography of the current speaker and a history of the office.
List of past speakers.

Politics of Ontario
Ontario